The following is a list of armed conflicts with victims in 2014.

The Heidelberg Institute for International Conflict Research estimated that there were 223 politically-motivated armed conflicts (of which 46 estimated as highly violent: 21 full-scale wars, 25 limited wars) worldwide during 2014.

List guidelines 
This list is an archive of armed conflicts having done globally at least 100 victims and at least 1 victim during the year 2014.

10,000 or more deaths in 2014

1,000–9,999 deaths in 2014

100–999 deaths in 2014

Fewer than 100 deaths in 2014

Deaths by country
This section details armed-conflict-related fatalities by country.

See also
List of number of conflicts per year
List of active rebel groups
List of designated terrorist organizations
List of terrorist incidents
List of wars extended by diplomatic irregularity
Lists of wars
Uppsala Conflict Data Program
Failed State

References

Notes

Citations

2014
 
2014